The 2022 Lithuanian Athletics Championships was the 99th edition of the national championship in outdoor track and field for athletes in Lithuania. It was held between 25 and 26 June in Šiauliai. Heptathlon and decathlon was held between 10 and 11 May in Šiauliai. 20 kilometres walk was held in 20 May in Alytus.

Results 
Source:

Men

Women

References

External links 
Lithuanian Athletics Association website 

Lithuanian Athletics Championships
Athletics
Lithuanian Athletics Championships